Death Rides a Pale Cow is a greatest hits album by the punk rock band the Dead Milkmen, released in 1997.

Release
The compilation contains two previously unreleased songs: "Milkmen Stomp" and "Labor Day". The band was unable to include tracks from Soul Rotation and Not Richard, But Dick, as Hollywood Records still retained the rights. It takes its name from an early cassette-only release.

Critical reception
The A.V. Club wrote: "Not surprisingly, the album's best moments arrive fairly early in the proceedings, with such banner moments as 'Bitchin' Camaro', 'Beach Party Vietnam' and 'Instant Club Hit' serving to remind fans what was so great about the band in the first place. Latter-day cult hits ('Punk Rock Girl', 'Smokin' Banana Peels') are briskly appealing, but Dead Milkmen was at its best when it was at its smallest and, by extension, meanest. By the end, its bratty edge was dulled to an unfortunate degree, but nearly all of its best moments are on this worthwhile collection." The Columbus Dispatch wrote that "nothing or no one escapes the Milkmen's savage wit." 

Entertainment Weekly included the compilation on its list of "Great American Novelties".

Track listing
 "Milkmen Stomp" (The Meatmen cover) 
 "Tiny Town"
 "Big Lizard"
 "Bitchin' Camaro"
 "Nutrition"
 "Dean's Dream"
 "Beach Party Vietnam"
 "The Thing That Only Eats Hippies"
 "Big Time Operator"
 "Instant Club Hit"
 "Surfin' Cow"
 "Labor Day"
 "I Walk the Thinnest Line"
 "Stuart"
 "Punk Rock Girl"
 "Smokin' Banana Peels"
 "Life Is Shit"
 "Do the Brown Nose"
 "If You Love Someone Set Them On Fire"
 "Peter Bazooka"
 "The Girl With the Strong Arm"
 "Big Deal"
 "The Blues Song"

Tracks 1 and 12 are previously unreleased
Tracks 2-6 appeared on the 1985 album Big Lizard In My Backyard
Tracks 7 and 8 appeared on the 1986 album Eat Your Paisley
Tracks 9-11 appeared on the 1987 album Bucky Fellini
Tracks 13-17 appeared on the 1988 album Beelzebubba
Tracks 18 and 19 appeared on the 1990 album Metaphysical Graffiti
Tracks 20-23 appeared on the 1995 album Stoney's Extra Stout (Pig)

References

1997 greatest hits albums
The Dead Milkmen albums
Comedy rock compilation albums